

History
Miami-Dade County Public Schools is the fourth largest school system in the United States with over 392 schools, 345,000 students and over 40,000 employees.

Schools
The district covers a total of 415 institutions, including: 
 171  elementary schools
 50  middle schools
 50 K–8 centers
 54  charter schools
 23  vocational schools
  5  magnet schools
 18  alternative schools
  5  special education centers

Elementary schools  
There are 171 elementary schools serving MDCPS. These schools usually teach grades from Pre-K to 5th or 6th.

Amelia Earhart Elementary School
Arch Creek Elementary School
Arcola Lake Elementary School
Auburndale Elementary School
Avocado Elementary School
Banyan Elementary School
Barbara Hawkins Elementary School
Bel-Aire Elementary School
Ben Sheppard Elementary School
Benjamin Franklin Elementary School
Bent Tree Elementary School
Biscayne Elementary School
Biscayne Gardens Elementary School
Blue Lakes Elementary School
Bowman Foster Ashe Elementary School
Brentwood Elementary School
Broadmoor Elementary School
Bunche Park Elementary School
Calusa Elementary School
Campbell Drive Elementary School
Caribbean Elementary School
Carol City Elementary School
Carrie P. Meek/Westview Elementary School
Charles D. Wyche, Jr. Elementary School
Charles R. Drew Elementary School
Charles R. Hadley Elementary School
Christina M. Eve Elementary School
Citrus Grove Elementary School
Claude Pepper Elementary School
Coconut Grove Elementary School
Colonial Drive Elementary School
Comstock Elementary School
Coral Park Elementary School
Coral Reef Elementary School
Coral Terrace Elementary School
Crestview Elementary School
Cutler Ridge Elementary School
Cypress Elementary School
David Fairchild Elementary School
Dante B. Fascell Elementary School
Devon Aire Elementary School
Dr. Carlos J. Finlay Elementary School
Dr. Edward L. Whigham Elementary School
Dr. Gilbert L. Porter Elementary School
Dr. H. W. Mack/West Little River Elementary School
Dr. Manuel Barreiro Elementary School
E.W.F. Stirrup Elementary School
Earlington Heights Elementary School
Edison Park Elementary School
Emerson Elementary School
Eneida Massas Hartner Elementary School
Ethel F. Beckford/Richmond Elementary School
Ethel Koger Beckham Elementary School
Fairlawn Elementary School
Flagami Elementary School
Flamingo Elementary School
Florida City Elementary School
Frances S. Tucker Elementary School
Frederick Douglass Elementary School
Fulford Elementary School
George Washington Carver Elementary School
Gertrude Edelmann/Sabal Palm Elementary School
Gloria Floyd Elementary School
Golden Glades Elementary School
Goulds Elementary School
Gratigny Elementary School
Greenglade Elementary School
Greynolds Park Elementary School
Gulfstream Elementary School
Henry E. S. Reeves Elementary School
Henry M. Flagler Elementary School
Hialeah Elementary School
Hialeah Gardens Elementary School
Hibiscus Elementary School
Holmes Elementary School
Howard Drive Elementary School
Irving & Beatrice Peskoe Elementary School
J.W. Johnson Elementary School
Jack D. Gordon Elementary School
James H. Bright Elementary School
Joe Hall Elementary School
Joella C. Good Elementary School
John G. Dupuis Elementary School
John I. Smith Elementary School
Kelsey L. Pharr Elementary School
Kendale Elementary School
Kendale Lakes Elementary School
Kensington Park Elementary School
Kinloch Park Elementary School
Lake Stevens Elementary School
Lakeview Elementary School
Laura C. Sanders Elementary School
Lenora B. Smith Elementary School
Liberty City Elementary School
Lillie C. Evans Elementary School

Little River Elementary School
Lorah Park Elementary School
Ludlam Elementary School
Madie Ives Elementary School
Mae Walters Elementary School
Marjory Stoneman Douglas Elementary School
Martin Luther King Elementary School
Maya Angelou Elementary School
Meadowlane Elementary School
Melrose Elementary School
Miami Gardens Elementary School
Miami Heights Elementary School
Miami Park Elementary School
Miami Shores Elementary School
Miami Springs Elementary School
Morningside Elementary School
Myrtle Grove Elementary School
Naranja Elementary School
Nathan Young Elementary School
Natural Bridge Elementary School
Norland Elementary School
Norma Butler Bossard Elementary School
North Beach Elementary School
North County Elementary School
North Dade Center for Modern Language
North Glade Elementary School
North Hialeah Elementary School
North Miami Elementary School
North Twin Lakes Elementary School
Norwood Elementary School
Oak Grove Elementary School
Ojus Elementary School
Olinda Elementary School
Oliver Hoover Elementary School
Olympia Heights Elementary School
Orchard Villa Elementary School
Palm Lakes Elementary School
Palm Springs North Elementary School
Palmetto Elementary School
Parkview Elementary School
Parkway Elementary School
Paul Laurence Dunbar Elementary
Perrine Elementary School
Phillis Wheatley Elementary School
Phyllis Ruth Miller Elementary School
Pine Lake Elementary School
Pine Villa Elementary School
Pinecrest Elementary School
Poinciana Park Elementary School
Rainbow Park Elementary School
Redland Elementary School
Redondo Elementary School
Riverside Elementary School
Robert Russa Moton Elementary School
Rockway Elementary School
Royal Green Elementary School
Royal Palm Elementary School
Santa Clara Elementary School
Scott Lake Elementary School
Seminole Elementary School
Shadowlawn Elementary School
Shenandoah Elementary School
Silver Bluff Elementary School
Skyway Elementary School
Snapper Creek Elementary School
South Hialeah Elementary School
South Miami Elementary School
South Miami Heights Elementary School
South Pointe Elementary School
Southside Elementary School
Spanish Lake Elementary School
Springview Elementary School
Sunset Elementary School
Sunset Park Elementary School
Sweetwater Elementary School
Sylvania Heights Elementary School
Thena C. Crowder Elementary School
Toussaint L'Ouverture Elementary School
Treasure Island Elementary School
Tropical Elementary School
Twin Lakes Elementary School
Van E. Blanton Elementary School
Village Green Elementary School
Vineland Elementary School
Virginia A. Boone/Highland Oaks Elementary School
W. J. Bryan Elementary School
Wesley Matthews Elementary School
West Hialeah Gardens Elementary School
West Homestead Elementary School
West Laboratory Elementary School
Whispering Pines Elementary School
William A. Chapman Elementary School
William Lehman Elementary School
Zora Neale Hurston Elementary School

Middle schools 

There are 58 middle schools serving MDCPS. They usually teach grades 6th to 8th, with exceptions also including 9th grade.

Allapattah Middle School
Andover Middle School
Arvida Middle School
Brownsville Middle School
Campbell Drive Middle School
Carol City Middle School
Charles R. Drew Middle School
Citrus Grove Middle School
Country Club Middle School
Cutler Ridge Middle School
Doral Middle School
George Washington Carver Middle School
Glades Middle School
Ham Middle School
Hammocks Middle School
Henry H. Filer Middle School
Herbert A. Ammons Middle School
Hialeah Gardens Middle School
Hialeah Middle School
Highland Oaks Middle School
Homestead Middle School
Horace Mann Middle School
Howard D. McMillan Middle School
John F. Kennedy Middle School
Jorge Mas Canosa Middle School
Jose de Diego Middle School
Kinloch Park Middle School
Lake Stevens Middle School
Lamar Louise Curry Middle School

Lawton Chiles Middle School
Madison Middle School
Miami Arts Studio @Zelda Glazer 6-12
Miami Edison Middle School
Miami Lakes Middle School
Miami Springs Middle School
Nautilus Middle School
Norland Middle School
North Dade Middle School
North Miami Middle School
Palm Springs Middle School
Palmetto Middle School
Parkway Middle School
Paul W. Bell Middle School
Ponce de Leon Middle School
Redland Middle School
Richmond Heights Middle School
Riviera Middle School
Rockway Middle School
Ruben Dario Middle School
Shenandoah Middle School
South Dade Middle School, grades 4-8
South Miami Middle School
Southwood Middle School
Thomas Jefferson Middle School
W.R. Thomas Middle School
West Miami Middle School
Westview Middle School

K–8 centers  
There are 50 kindergarten-to-8th grade centers (or "academies") serving MDCPS. K–8 centers are generally set up to serve communities with limited building space for two separate campuses. They are run as both an elementary and middle school out of the same campus, with joint administration, staff, and schedules. Middle school-aged students generally have separate buildings dedicated to them. MDCPS provides a full list of the K-8 schools.

Ada Merritt
Air Base K-8 Center
Aventura Waterways
Benjamin Franklin
Bob Graham Education Center
Bowman Ashe/Doolin
Campbell Drive
Carrie P. Meek/Westview
Charles R. Drew
Coconut Palm 
Coral Gables Preparatory Academy
Coral Way Bilingual
David Lawrence Jr. 
Devon Aire K-8 Center  
Dr. Henry W. Mack/West Little River
Dr. Rolando Espinosa K-8 Center 
Ernest R Graham K-8 Academy
Kenwood K-8 Center
Ernest R Graham
Eugenia B. Thomas 
Everglades
Fienberg/Fisher
Frank C. Martin International
Gateway Environmental

Hubert O. Sibley K-8 Academy 
Irving & Beatrice Peskoe
Jane S. Roberts
John I. Smith
Kenwood K-8 Center
Key Biscayne
Leewood
Leisure City
Lillie C. Evans
Linda Lentin
Mandarin Lakes
Marcus A. Milam 
Miami Lakes
Morningside
Myrtle Grove
Norman S. Edelcup/Sunny Isles Beach
North County
Paul Laurence Dunbar
Ruth K. Broad Bay Harbor K-8 Center
South Miami
Vineland
Winston Park

High schools  
There are 37 high schools serving MDCPS. They teach grades from 9th to 12th. The first high school, Miami Senior High School, opened in 1898.

Alonzo and Tracy Mourning Senior High Biscayne Bay Campus (2009)
American High School (1976)
Barbara Goleman Senior High School (1995)
J.C. Bermudez Doral Senior High School (2020)
Coral Gables Senior High School (1950)
Cutler Bay Senior High School (2012)
 D.A. Dorsey Sr. High School (1938)
Dr. Michael M. Krop High School (1998)
Felix Varela High School (2000)
G. Holmes Braddock High School (1989)
Hialeah Gardens High School (2009)
Hialeah High School (1954)
Hialeah-Miami Lakes High School (1971)
Homestead High School (1979)
John A. Ferguson High School (2003)
Miami Beach Senior High School (1924)
Miami Carol City High School (1963)
Miami Central High School (1959)
Miami Coral Park High School (1963)
Miami Edison High School (1930)
Miami High School (1903)
Miami Jackson High School (1898)
Miami Killian High School (1965)
Miami Norland High School (1958)
Miami Northwestern High School (1951)
Miami Palmetto High School (1958)
Miami Southridge High School (1974)
Miami Springs High School (1964)
Miami Sunset High School (1977)
North Dade Jr./ Sr. High School (1957)
North Miami Beach High School (1971)
North Miami High School (1954)
Ronald W. Reagan/Doral High School (2006)
School for Advanced Studies (1988)
South Dade High School (1953)
South Miami High School (1971)
Southwest Miami Senior High School (1956)
Booker T. Washington High School (1926)
Westland Hialeah High School (2007)
Young Men's Preparatory Academy (all-boys) (2008)

Magnet high schools 

There are 120 magnet schools serving MDCPS. They normally serve grades 9th to 12th. These schools do not take in students from their area. Instead, students must apply and test into these schools, which offer specific courses of study.

Arthur & Polly Mays Conservatory of the Arts 6-12
Booker T. Washington High School
Coral Reef Senior High School
 Cutler Bay Senior High School
Design and Architecture High School (DASH)
Hialeah Miami-Lakes iPrep Academy
José Martí MAST 6-12 Academy
Law Enforcement Officers' Memorial High School
Maritime and Science Technology Academy (MAST Academy)
MAST @ FIU Biscayne Bay Campus 
MAST Academy @ Homestead Medical Magnet
Miami Arts Studio 6-12 @ Zelda Glazer

Miami Beach Senior High School
Miami Lakes Educational Center
New World School of the Arts
Robert Morgan Educational Center
School for Advanced Studies
South Dade High School
TERRA Environmental Research Institute
William H. Turner Technical Arts High School
Young Women's Preparatory Academy

Adult/vocational centers  
There are 23 adult/vocational centers, more commonly referred to as "night schools", serving MDCPS. These centers are set up for adults to earn G.E.D.s, or for students older than the age of 16 to make up classes they have failed and have no slots for in their daytime schedules. Some night schools also offer vocational programs and free English classes for non-native speakers.  Adult centers also offer free citizenship classes. They also offer Saturday classes to accommodate students who can't attend during the week.  They are generally housed at high school campuses, with classes taking place in the evenings.

American High School Adult Center
Coral Gables High School Adult Center
D.A. Dorsey Educational Center
English Center
George T. Baker Aviation
Hialeah Adult Education Center
Hialeah-Miami Lakes Senior High School Adult Center
Lindsey Hopkins Technology Center
Miami Beach High School Adult Center
Miami Coral Park High School Adult Center
Miami Jackson High School Adult Center
Miami Lakes Adult Education Center

Miami Palmetto High School Adult Education Center
Miami Senior High School Adult Education Center
Miami Springs Senior High School Adult Education Center
Miami Sunset High School Adult Center
North Miami High School Adult Center
Robert Morgan Vocational Technical Institute
South Dade High School Adult Center
South Dade High School Skills Center
Southwest High School Adult Center
Virtual Adult Center - online school
William H. Turner Technical Adult & Community Education Center

Charter schools  
There are 53 charter schools that are set up as publicly funded, but are privately operated, in MDCPS. Currently there are around 19,000 students enrolled in charter schools in the county. Students that attend these schools do not need to pass an examination before being considered for a spot, but must maintain specific grades and behavioral standards to maintain their enrollment.

Archimedean Academy (elementary)
Archimedean Middle Conservatory (middle)
Archimedean Upper Conservatory (high)
ASPIRA Eugenio Maria de Hostos Youth Leadership (middle)
ASPIRA Raúl Arnaldo Martinez Charter School (middle)
ASPIRA South Youth Leadership Charter School (middle)
Aventura City of Excellence Charter School (K-8 center)
Balere Language Academy (K-8 center)
Bridgeprep Academy of Arts and Minds (high)
The Charter School at Waterstone (K-8 center)
A Child's Journey Charter School (elementary)
City of Hialeah Educational Academy (high)
Coral Reef Montessori Academy Charter School (K-8 center)
Doctors Charter School of Miami Shores (middle/high)
Doral Academy (elementary)
Doral Academy Charter Middle School (middle)
Doral Academy High School (high)
Doral Performing Arts & Entertainment Academy (high)
Downtown Doral Charter Elementary School (elementary)
Downtown Miami Charter School (elementary)
Early Beginnings Academy – Civic Center (elementary)
Early Beginnings Academy – North Shore (elementary)
 Everglades Preparatory Academy (middle/high)
Florida International Academy (middle)
International Studies Charter High School (high)
Keys Gate Charter School (K-8 center)
Lawrence Academy (middle)
Life Skills Center Miami-Dade County (high)
Mater Academy Charter Middle/High School (middle/high)

Mater Academy East Charter School (middle/high)
Mater Academy Elementary School (elementary)
Mater East Academy Middle School (middle)
Mater Performing Arts & Entertainment Academy (high)
Miami Arts Charter School (middle/high)
Miami Children's Museum Charter School (elementary)
Miami Community Charter School (elementary)
Oxford Academy of Miami (elementary)
 Palm Glades Preparatory Academy (middle/high)
Pinecrest Academy Charter Middle School (middle)
Pinecrest Preparatory (high)
Pinecrest Preparatory Academy (elementary)
Renaissance Elementary Charter School (elementary)
Renaissance Middle Charter School (middle)
Rosa Parks Charter School/Florida City (K-8 center)
Sandor Wiener School of Opportunity (elementary)
Sandor Wiener School of Opportunity, South (elementary)
School for Integrated Academics & Technologies (high)
Somerset Academy (elementary)
Somerset Academy Charter High School (high)
Somerset Academy Charter Middle School (middle)
Spiral Tech Elementary Charter School (elementary)
Spirit City Academy (middle)
Summerville Advantage Academy (elementary)
Sunshine Academy (K-8 center)
Theodore R. and Thelma A. Gibson Charter School (K-8 center)
The SEED School of Miami (6th-12th)
Transitional Learning Academy (middle/high)
Youth Co-Op Charter School (K-8 center)

Alternative schools   
There are 16 alternative schools serving MDCPS. They are set up for as a last resort for students who have recurring behavioral or extreme academic problems. Any child released from a youth detention center must attend an alternative school until deemed ready to return to normal school.

The 500 Role Model Academy
Academy for Community Education
Alternative Outreach Program
C.O.P.E. North Alternative Education
Corporate Academy North
Corporate Academy South
D.A. Dorsey Educational Center
Dorothy Wallace Educational Center
Headstart Transition Center
J. R. E. Lee Educational Center
Jann Mann Opportunity Education
Juvenile Justice Center
M-DVS, Miami Dade Virtual School/FLVS
Miami Douglas MacArthur North
Miami Douglas MacArthur South
TAP Program

Specialized centers  
There are five specialized centers serving MDCPS. They are for students with extreme mental or learning disabilities which would impair them from attending classes with students without these disabilities. It is becoming more and more common for regular schools to set up their own specialized education (special ed) programs.

Instructional Systemwide Center - administrative office that runs the individual school programs
Merrick Education Center
Neva King Cooper Educational Center
Robert Rennick Education Center
Ruth Owens Krusé Education Center

Gallery

References

 
Miami-related lists
Miami-Dade County Public Schools